In statistical mechanics, the metastate is a probability measure on the
space of all thermodynamic states for a system with quenched randomness. The term metastate, in this context, was first used in by Charles M. Newman and Daniel L. Stein in 1996.. 

Two different versions have been proposed:

1) The Aizenman-Wehr construction, a canonical ensemble approach,
constructs the metastate through an ensemble of states obtained by varying
the random parameters in the Hamiltonian outside of the volume being
considered.

2) The Newman-Stein metastate, a microcanonical ensemble approach,
constructs an empirical average from a deterministic (i.e., chosen
independently of the randomness) subsequence of finite-volume Gibbs distributions.

It was proved for Euclidean lattices that there always
exists a deterministic subsequence along which the Newman-Stein and
Aizenman-Wehr constructions result in the same metastate.  The metastate is
especially useful in systems where deterministic sequences of volumes fail
to converge to a thermodynamic state, and/or there are many competing
observable thermodynamic states.

As an alternative usage, "metastate" can refer to thermodynamic states, where the system is in a metastable state (for example  superheated or undercooled liquids, when the actual temperature of the liquid is above or below the boiling or freezing temperature, but the material is still in a liquid state).

References

Statistical mechanics
Condensed matter physics